Afaha Atai is a village in Eket local government area of Akwa Ibom State. It is surrounded by Afaha Ukwa, Ata Idung Afaha Ekid, Atai Ndon-Afaha Ekid, Ebana and Ede Urua.

The people of Afaha Atai primarily engage in farming and cultivating of Palm Tree, Yams, Cassava and Palm Wine. They speak Ekid.

References 

Villages in Akwa Ibom